The Papercut Chronicles is the second studio album by Gym Class Heroes released in 2005 by Fueled by Ramen/Decaydance. A sequel, The Papercut Chronicles II, was  released in 2011. The album has sold over 32,000 copies in US.

Track listing

Standard Edition 
 "Za Intro" – 1:40
 "Papercuts" – 3:26
 "Petrified Life and the Twice Told Joke (Decrepit Bricks)" – 4:53
 "Make Out Club" – 4:43
 "Taxi Driver" – 1:59
 "So Long Friend" – 1:14
 "Everyday's Forecast" – 4:21
 "Pillmatic" – 3:11
 "Simple Livin'" – 3:06
 "Cupid's Chokehold" (featuring Patrick Stump) – 4:03
 "Faces in the Hall" – 4:13
 "Graduation Day" – 1:44
 "Apollo 3-1-5" – 2:29
 "wejusfreestylin'pt2" – 1:12
 "To Bob Ross with Love" – 2:38
 "Papercuts (The Reason for the Lesions Remix by Mr. Dibbs)"  – 3:46
 "Kid Nothing vs. the Echo Factor" – 4:01
 "Band Aids" – 4:58
 The song "Band Aids" ends at minute 1:52. After 2 minutes and 10 seconds of silence (1:52 - 4:02), begins an untitled hidden track: it's a computer generated voice that talks.

Japanese Bonus Track 
 "Boomerang Theory" (Bonus Track)

Bonus Remix CD 
 "Chicago" (Remix) 
 "Heart Transplant" (Remix)
 "Attention" (Remix)
 "Gotta Get Out of Here" (Remix)

Personnel 
Credits adapted from album’s liner notes.

Gym Class Heroes
 Travis McCoy - vocals
 Matt McGinley - drums
 Ryan Geise - bass
 Disashi Lumumba-Kasongo - guitar
Additional personnel
 Doug White - producer, engineer
 Milo Bonacci - guitars
 Sie One - production (tracks 1, 8, 12, and 18)
 Gary Ventura - photography
 Evan Leake - CD layout/design
 Patrick Stump - guest vocals (track 10)
 Adam English - piano (track 10)
 Rand Bellavia - additional backing vocals (track 10)
 Matt Green - mixing and additional engineering (track 10)
 Mr. Dibbs - remixing (track 16)
Chris Alsip - guest vocals (track 16)

Additional notes 
 "Kid Nothing vs. the Echo Factor" is a commentary on mainstream rap music from Travis' point of view as a rapper himself.
 The lyrics in the outro of "Kid Nothing vs. the Echo Factor" are derived from the first line of Pink Floyd's "Comfortably Numb".
 "Cupid's Chokehold" samples extensively from Supertramp's song "Breakfast in America".
 "Taxi Driver" is an homage to other contemporary bands in the indie rock and punk genres.
 The Papercut Chronicles version of the "Cupid's Chokehold" music video was directed by Andrew Paul Bowser who would later co-direct the "New Friend Request" video with Joseph M. Petrick for their album As Cruel as School Children.
 "Make Out Club" includes a reference to the song "Girl or Dog?" by Travis's old side project Bernie Allen.
 "To Bob Ross With Love" is an updated version of "Happy Little Trees" which appears on the album ...For the Kids.

References

Gym Class Heroes albums
2005 albums
Fueled by Ramen albums